MS Translandia was a freight/passenger ferry owned by the shipping company Salem Al Makrani Cargo from Dubai. She was built in 1976 by J. J. Sietas Werft, Hamburg, West Germany for Poseidon Schiffahrts oHG as MS Transgermania. Between 2004 and 2012 she sailed for Finnish shipping company Eckerö Line on their route connecting Helsinki, Finland, to Tallinn, Estonia.

References

External links
 Eckerö Line official website
 Vessel's Details, Last Position and photos at Marine Traffic
 Eckerö Line Translandia arriving Helsinki

Ferries of Finland
Ships built in Hamburg
1976 ships